Fourth Ring Road may refer to:

 4th Ring Road (Beijing), China
 Fourth Ring Road (Wuhan), China
 Ring 4 Route, a super bikeways in metropolitan Copenhagen, Denmark
 Ring 4, one of the motorways in Denmark
 Vierter Ring unfinished ring road of the Reichs Capital Germania, Germany
 , Russia

See also

 List of ring roads
 Ring 4 (disambiguation)